Tony! Toni! Toné! was an American soul/R&B band from Oakland, California, popular during the late 1980s and early to mid-1990s. During the band's heyday, it was composed of D'wayne Wiggins on lead vocals and guitar, his brother Raphael Saadiq (born Charles Ray Wiggins) on lead vocals and bass, and their cousin Timothy Christian Riley on drums, keyboards, and background vocals. Originally, the band went by "Tony, Toni, Toné" as a joke, until they realized it "had a nice ring to it".

After their debut album Who? in 1988 followed by The Revival in 1990, the group achieved their greatest commercial success with the double platinum certified Sons of Soul in 1993. Tony! Toni! Toné! disbanded after the release of their fourth album House of Music (1996), which critics cite as their best work.

History

1988–1992: Who? and The Revival

Their first album, Who?, produced and co-written by Denzil Foster and Thomas McElroy, was released in 1988. The album went gold and had several hit singles. The first of these, "Little Walter" went to #1 on the R&B charts. The next three singles, "Born Not to Know", "Baby Doll" and "For the Love of You" were all Top 10 R&B singles. Who? was a modest success. It charted for 44 weeks on the Billboard Top Pop Albums, peaking at number 69, and produced four singles, including the R&B hit "Little Walter". On December 5, 1989, the album was certified gold by the Recording Industry Association of America (RIAA), for shipments of 500,000 copies in the United States. As of August 1993, it has sold over 700,000 copies in the US.

Inspired by live instrumentation, turntablism, and classic soul music, Tony! Toni! Toné! recorded and produced their second album, The Revival, mostly themselves and released it in 1990 to commercial success. Released on May 8, 1990, by Wing Records, The Revival charted for 64 weeks on the Billboard Top Pop Albums, peaking at number 34 on the chart. The group's second album The Revival was released in 1990 and reached platinum status. The album spawned several #1 R&B hits with "It Never Rains (In Southern California)", "Feels Good", "The Blues", and "Whatever You Want" all topping the R&B charts. "Feels Good" was the group's first single to breach the Top 10 of the Billboard Hot 100 and went gold. The album's second single "Feels Good" was released on June 19 and certified gold on November 13 after it had shipped 500,000 copies. The single topped the R&B chart for two weeks and reached number nine on the Billboard Hot 100 in the fall of 1990, going on to sell over one million copies. In late 1990, the album's fourth single "It Never Rains (In Southern California)" became a number-one R&B hit and also peaked at number 34 on the Hot 100.

The Revival broadened the group's exposure to fans beyond their initial R&B audience. However, they became ambivalent about their newfound mainstream success and their music being labeled "retro" by critics. In an interview for People magazine, lead singer and bassist Raphael Wiggins expressed his dissatisfaction with the music industry, saying that "every record company wants to get a group and put 'em in a Benz with a car phone and a beeper, show them dressing in three different outfits, put them in a video shot on a beach with lots of swinging bikinis. You won't ever see us on a beach. We're just down-to-earth, funky, like-to-play guys." Before considering a follow-up album, the band recorded several songs for film soundtracks, including "Me and You" for Boyz n the Hood (1991), "House Party (I Don't Know What You Come to Do)" for House Party 2 (1991), and "Waiting on You" for Poetic Justice (1993).

1992–1995: Sons of Soul
Having fulfilled their creative intentions with The Revival, Tony! Toni! Toné! wanted to pay homage to their musical influences with Sons of Soul. In a 1993 interview for The New York Times, Wiggins elaborated on their direction for the album, stating "We're paying homage to a lot of older artists who paved the way for us artists like the Temptations, Sly and the Family Stone, Earth, Wind and Fire. They're the people who inspired us when we were growing up, people like Aretha Franklin, James Brown. We feel we're the sons of everything and all those people who came before us." He also explained the album's title as a declaration of them being descendants of those artists, "not in a grandiose sense, but from the standpoint that we really are the musical offspring of all that's come before us ... paying homage to our past, but creating in a contemporary environment."

Tony! Toni! Toné! took a hiatus as a group after the commercial and critical success of Sons of Soul. According to vocalist and bassist Raphael Wiggins, each member had pursued individual music projects, and "the group was trying to figure out where everybody's time, space and head was at." He, D'wayne Wiggins, and Timothy Christian Riley worked on songwriting and production for other recording artists during the band's hiatus, including D'Angelo, En Vogue, Karyn White, Tevin Campbell, and A Tribe Called Quest. Raphael Wiggins adopted the surname "Saadiq" for his professional name in 1994—"man of his word" in Arabic—and released his solo single "Ask of You" in 1995. Their work outside the band led to rumors of a break-up during the time between albums. Tony! Toni! Toné! eventually regrouped and began recording House of Music in September 1995.

1996–1998: House of Music
In 1996, the group released their final studio album to date, House of Music. The album lacked the strong singles of earlier entries, only getting "Thinking Of You" & "Let's Get Down" into the top 10 on the R&B charts, with "Thinking Of You" hitting #22 on the Hot 100, though it eventually reached platinum status.

House of Music expanded on Tony! Toni! Toné!'s previous traditional R&B-influenced work by emphasizing live instrumentation and ballads. In the opinion of Daily Herald writer Dan Kening, the album continued the band's mix of contemporary R&B and old-fashioned soul, deeming it "half a tribute to their '60s and '70s soul music roots and half a masterful blend of modern smooth balladeering and danceable funk." Released on November 19, 1996, House of Music reached number 32 on the Billboard 200 and spent 31 weeks on the chart. In its first eight weeks, the album sold 318,502 copies in the US. Tony! Toni! Toné! inaugurated its release with a satellite press conference and in-store performance at a small retail outlet in the San Francisco Bay Area. They also embarked on a tour of historically black colleges and Black Independent Coalition record shops after "Let's Get Down" had been sent to R&B and crossover radio on October 28 as the album's lead single; its music video was released to outlets such as BET, The Box, and MTV. Tony! Toni! Toné! performed the song on the sketch comedy show All That; on the music variety program Soul Train, they performed "Let's Get Down" and "Annie May". "Thinking of You" was released as the second single on March 11, 1997, by which time House of Music had sold 514,000 copies, according to Nielsen SoundScan. On August 6, the album was certified Platinum by the Recording Industry Association of America (RIAA).

The single "Me & You" appears on the soundtrack to the motion picture Boyz n the Hood. Following the release of Sons of Soul, the group was a part of the R&B supergroup Black Men United, along with Silk and H-Town. The song "U Will Know" appeared on the soundtrack for the movie Jason's Lyric.

Other endeavors
Raphael Saadiq released his first solo effort, the Top 20 Billboard hit "Ask of You" for the Higher Learning soundtrack, in 1995. Around the same time, Saadiq became a much-sought-after R&B producer, scoring hits for D'Angelo, Total, The Roots, and others. Later in the 2000s, he started a solo career, releasing two albums:  Instant Vintage (2002) and Ray Ray (2004). He was replaced by Amar Khalil in the band. Regarding changing his surname to 'Saadiq' for a solo career, in February 2009 Raphael stated to writer Pete Lewis of Blues & Soul: "I just wanted to have my own identity".

Lucy Pearl was an R&B supergroup formed in 1999 as the brainchild of Raphael Saadiq. The other members of Lucy Pearl were Dawn Robinson (En Vogue) and Ali Shaheed Muhammad (A Tribe Called Quest). They released their self-titled debut album in 2000. After two singles, "Dance Tonight" and "Don't Mess with My Man", Dawn Robinson left and was replaced by Joi. The new line-up released the track "Without You". The group split up shortly after, releasing no other material.

In 2005, D'wayne Wiggins became the bandleader for the Weekends at the D.L. television show hosted by comedian D. L. Hughley, which aired on the Comedy Central cable network until 2006. D'wayne Wiggins solo album, Eyes Never Lie, sold approximately 150,000 units.

Reunions
In 2003, members of Tony! Toni! Toné!, except for Saadiq, were invited by Alicia Keys to be guest artists on her album The Diary of Alicia Keys. The song that resulted from that session was called "Diary." Released as a single in the fall of 2004, it gave them their first Top 10 US hit in eleven years and a nomination for Best R&B Performance by a Duo or Group with Vocals at the 2005 Grammy Awards.

Discography

Studio albums
 Who? (1988)
 The Revival (1990)
 Sons of Soul (1993)
 House of Music (1996)

See also
List of number-one dance hits (United States)
List of artists who reached number one on the US Dance chart

References

External links

 

 
African-American musical groups
American boy bands
American dance music groups
American soul musical groups
New jack swing music groups
Mercury Records artists
Musical groups from Oakland, California
Musical groups established in 1988
1988 establishments in California
Musical groups from the San Francisco Bay Area
Musical groups disestablished in 1997
Sibling musical groups